231st may refer to:

231st Battalion (Seaforth Highlanders of Canada), CEF, a unit in the Canadian Expeditionary Force during the First World War
231st Combat Communications Squadron, a tenant unit of the 113th Wing based at Andrews Air Force Base, Maryland, USA
231st Infantry Brigade, the Allied codename for the centre invasion beach during the World War II Allied invasion of Normandy, 6 June 1944

See also
231 (number)
231st Street (IRT Broadway – Seventh Avenue Line), a local station on the IRT Broadway – Seventh Avenue Line of the New York City Subway
231, the year 231 (CCXXXI) of the Julian calendar